Vertebra may refer to:
Vertebra, a bone in the spinal column of a vertebrate animal
Vertebra (software), an environment for developing distributed software applications
Vertebrae (album), the album by Norwegian metal band Enslaved

See also
Vertebrate, an animal that has vertebrae